Sangham is a 1988 Indian Malayalam-language film, directed by Joshiy and produced by K. Rajagopal. The film stars Mammootty, Thilakan, Parvathy and Saritha in the lead roles. The film has musical score by Shyam.

Plot 
The film is about a spoiled brat Kuttappai and his young friends. Kuttappai is the son of Rappai, a rich miser. Kuttappai make all sorts of trouble in his village. One related to a snake boat race made him and his friends get exiled to a neighboring state. Unknown to Kuttappai, he has an illegitimate daughter. She is taken care by his father through a servant. The servant takes money and land and promises Rappai to take care of Kuttappai's daughter. The servant uses the money and land for his own growth and pushes Kuttappai's wife into prostitution. When matters get hairy, the servant tries to sell Kuttappai's daughter to prostitution as well. When Kuttappai learns of the situation, he is able to save his daughter, but loses her mother in the process.

Cast

Mammootty as Illikkal Kuttappai
Thilakan as Illikkal Rappai
Parvathy Jayaram as Aswathy
Saritha as Ammini
Seema as Mollykutty
Mukesh as Raju
Jagadish as Palunni
K. B. Ganesh Kumar as Anil
Appa Haja as Alex
Innocent
Prathapachandran as Panicker
Balan K. Nair as Mathai
Jagannatha Varma
K. P. A. C. Azeez
V. K. Sreeraman as Roy 
Vinu Chakravarthy as Kuppusamy Thevar
Kunchan as Muthu
P. C. George (Actor) as Prayakara Appa
James as Pappi

Release
The film was released on 18 May 1988.

Box office
The fim was commercial success.

Soundtrack
The music was composed by Shyam and the lyrics were written by Shibu Chakravarthy.

References

External links
 

1988 films
1980s Malayalam-language films
Films directed by Joshiy